Smeltertown was a residential community in El Paso County, Texas, housing the workers of the ASARCO smelter and their families, between El Paso and the Texas borders with Mexico and New Mexico.

With only one small neighborhood, now known as the La Calavera Historical Neighborhood, remaining since the Smelter's closure, Smeltertown is sometimes referred to as a ghost town.

The Smeltertown community was served by the San Jose church, and by the Jones School of the El Paso Independent School District.

See also 

 1913 El Paso smelters' strike

References

Ghost towns in Texas